Crave Records was a record label under Sony Music Entertainment founded by Mariah Carey in February 1997, and shut down in July 1998. Groups signed to the label included DJ Company, female R&B quartet Allure, who released a self-titled album featuring the hit singles "Head Over Heels", "All Cried Out", and "Last Chance" and male R&B quartet 7 Mile, who also released a self-titled album.

See also
 List of record labels

References

American record labels
Defunct record labels of the United States
Mariah Carey
Pop record labels
Record labels established in 1997
Record labels disestablished in 1998
Contemporary R&B record labels
Sony Music
Vanity record labels